David James Richie  (born September 26, 1973) is a former American football defensive tackle who played four seasons in the National Football League with the Denver Broncos, San Francisco 49ers, Jacksonville Jaguars and Green Bay Packers. He played college football at the University of Washington and attended Kelso High School in Kelso, Washington. He was a member of the Denver Broncos team that won Super Bowl XXXII over the Green Bay Packers. Richie also won the Million Dollar Game in the XFL as a member of the Los Angeles Xtreme.

References

External links
XFL Stats
Seattle Sports Blog
Sports Illustrated profile
College Stats
ESPN profile

Living people
1973 births
Players of American football from California
American football defensive tackles
Washington Huskies football players
Denver Broncos players
San Francisco 49ers players
Jacksonville Jaguars players
Green Bay Packers players
Los Angeles Xtreme players
Sportspeople from Orange, California